Microphthalma is a genus of bristle flies in the family Tachinidae. There are about 18 described species in Microphthalma.

Species
These 18 species belong to the genus Microphthalma:

 Microphthalma ascita Reinhard, 1953 c g
 Microphthalma crouzeli Blanchard, 1966 c g
 Microphthalma cuzcana (Townsend, 1912) c g
 Microphthalma differens (Wulp, 1890) c g
 Microphthalma disjuncta (Wiedemann, 1824) i c g b
 Microphthalma europacea Egger, 1860 c g
 Microphthalma europaea Egger, 1860 c g
 Microphthalma flavipes Mesnil, 1950 c g
 Microphthalma michiganensis (Townsend, 1892) i c g
 Microphthalma nigeriensis Villeneuve, 1935 c g
 Microphthalma nox Zeegers, 2007 c g
 Microphthalma obsoleta (Wulp, 1890) i g
 Microphthalma pedalis Reinhard, 1953 c g
 Microphthalma posio (Walker, 1849) c g
 Microphthalma ruficeps Aldrich, 1926 i c g
 Microphthalma sejuncta (Walker, 1858) c g
 Microphthalma vibrissata (Wulp, 1891) c g
 Microphthalma virens Aldrich, 1926 c g

Data sources: i = ITIS, c = Catalogue of Life, g = GBIF, b = Bugguide.net

References

Further reading

External links

 
 

Tachininae